"You Don't Have to Be a Baby to Cry" is a song written by Bob Merrill and Terry Shand, and first recorded in 1950 by Moon Mullican.

Other 1950 recordings
Jimmy Dorsey (with vocals by Terry Shand) 
Ernest Tubb - peaked at No. 10 on the Most Played Juke Box Folk chart

The Caravelles recording
British girl group the Caravelles recorded a version of the song in 1963. The single reached No. 6 on the UK Singles Chart in 1963.
In the US, it peaked at No. 3 on the U.S. Billboard Hot 100, and No. 2 on the Middle-Road Singles chart.

References

1950 songs
1950 singles
1963 debut singles
Ernest Tubb songs
Tennessee Ernie Ford songs
Songs written by Bob Merrill
Smash Records singles